Provincial roads are roads maintained by one or more of the 12 provinces of the Netherlands.

There are main roads, which run in multiple provinces, and province specific provincial roads.

Main provincial roads

References

Provincial